Dayanagar (Siyari) is a Rural Municipality in Rupandehi District in Lumbini Province of southern Nepal. At the time of the 1991 Nepal census it had a population of 7542 people living in 1265 individual households.

References

Populated places in Rupandehi District